Buy Herself is a Canadian reality television series, which premiered April 16, 2012 on HGTV Canada. Hosted by Sandra Rinomato, formerly of the HGTV series Property Virgins, the series focused on single women who are seeking to buy their first house on their own. Its format is otherwise similar to that of Property Virgins, with Rinomato showing the potential buyer three homes and discussing how to manage and balance needs and expectations and complications in the home-buying process.

Rinomato has stated in interviews that she was interested in doing a show focusing specifically on female homebuyers because as a relatively new social phenomenon, they face a unique set of personal and social pressures – such as family and cultural expectations that women are supposed to prioritize marriage over investment as a route to financial security – that can make the process more difficult and challenging for them than it is for a single man or a family.

Although the show is still featured on HGTV's website, only a single season was produced for airing.

Episodes

Season 1 (2012)

References

External links
Buy Herself

2010s Canadian reality television series
2012 Canadian television series debuts
2013 Canadian television series endings
HGTV (Canada) original programming